Dmitri Ivanovich Gunko (born 1 March 1976) is a Russian professional football coach and a former player. He is the manager of Armenian club Urartu.

Coaching career
He served as caretaker manager of FC Spartak Moscow to finish out the 2013–14 season after Valeri Karpin resigned on 18 March 2014.

On 1 August 2020, he was hired by Russian Premier League club FC Khimki. He left Khimki by mutual consent on 21 September 2020, after Khimki only gained 3 points in the first 8 games of the season.

On 5 November 2020, Gunko was appointed as Head Coach of Armenian Premier League club FC Noah.

On 14 June 2021, Gunko was appointed as Head Coach of Armenian Premier League club FC Ararat-Armenia. Following the conclusion of the 2021–22, Dmitri Gunko left his role as Head Coach after his contract was not extended.

On 27 June 2022, Urartu announced the appointment of Gunko as their new Head Coach.

Honours

As Coach
Ararat-Armenia
 Armenian Premier League: Runner-Up 2021–22

Noah
 Armenian Premier League: Runner-Up 2020–21

References

External links
 Profile on the Spartak Moscow site

1976 births
Footballers from Moscow
Living people
Russian footballers
Association football defenders
FC Spartak-2 Moscow players
FC Torpedo Vladimir players
FC Tyumen players
FC Arsenal Tula players
Russian First League players
Russian Second League players
Russian football managers
FC Spartak Moscow managers
FC Khimki managers
Russian Premier League managers
FC Urartu managers
Armenian Premier League managers
Russian expatriate football managers
Expatriate football managers in Armenia
Russian expatriate sportspeople in Armenia